Bestuzhevo is a rural locality (a selo) in Ilyinsky Selsoviet, Shipunovsky District, Altai Krai, Russia. The population was 235 as of 2013. There are 9 streets.

Geography 
Bestuzhevo is located 33 km southeast of Shipunovo (the district's administrative centre) by road. Meteli is the nearest rural locality.

References 

Rural localities in Shipunovsky District